Michael F. "Mike" Curtin is a former Democratic member of the Ohio House of Representatives for the 17th district.  He retired from The Dispatch Printing Company, the publisher of The Columbus Dispatch. He first joined the newspaper in 1973 as a reporter. He began covering the Ohio legislature as a reporter in 1982, and subsequently became public affairs editor and managing editor before retiring as associate publisher emeritus in 2007. He decided to run for the 17th district when he noticed that a redistricting left it without an incumbent. He was unopposed in the Democratic primary. In the general election he was opposed by Republican Nicholas A. Szabo, who he defeated with 62.6% of the vote. He was re-elected in 2014 after defeating Republican Mike Newbern, 55% to 45%.

Works
The Ohio Politics Almanac (1996)

References

External links
Campaign website

Living people
Democratic Party members of the Ohio House of Representatives
Ohio State University alumni
American political journalists
Year of birth missing (living people)
21st-century American politicians